Filomena Clarice Steady (previously Filomina Chioma Steady) is a US-based Sierra Leonean author and academic who specializes in the intersectionality of racism and sexism.

Early life and education 
Steady was born in Sierra Leone, studied in the US and England, and currently lives in the US.

She has a bachelor's degree from Smith College, a master's degree from Boston University, and a PhD in social anthropology from Oxford University.

Career 
Steady worked as a professor and as the director of women's studies at the California State University, Sacramento. In 1992, she took a career break from the university to work as a senior advisor on women and gender at the United Nations. She later worked at Wellesley College where she now holds the title of Professor Emerita of Africana Studies.

Steady is noted for her work demonstrating the connections between racism and sexism, and for advocating for "humanistic feminism" that includes the rights and needs of children as well as women.

Selected publications 
 "An Investigative Framework for Gender Research in Africa in the New Millennium" , in O. Oyewumi (ed.), African Gender Studies: Conceptual and Theoretical Issues, 2005, New York: Palgrave
 The Black Woman Cross-Culturally, Cambridge, Massachusetts, 1981, Schenkman Publishers, 
 Women and Collective Action in Africa, 2005, Palgrave Macmillan, 
 Women and the Amistad Connection: Sierra Leone Krio Society, 2011, Schenkman Publishers, 
 Women and Leadership in West Africa: Mothering the Nation and Humanizing the State, 2011, Palgrave Macmillan

References

External links 
 CV hosted by University of Wellesley
 "Filomina Steady | African Women’s Leadership through the Ages", Wellesley College, 28 March 2018.

20th-century Sierra Leonean writers
21st-century Sierra Leonean writers
Boston University alumni
California State University, Sacramento faculty
Gender studies academics
Living people
Sierra Leonean academics
Sierra Leonean feminists
Sierra Leonean women writers
Smith College alumni
Wellesley College faculty
Year of birth missing (living people)